Yellow Box may refer to:

 Eucalyptus melliodora, a tree
 Cocoa (API), formerly Yellow Box
 Yellow box, coloring assigned to severe thunderstorm watch boxes

See also
 Box junction, typically marked with a yellow grid